Oroszi is a surname. Notable people with the surname include:

Beatrix Oroszi, Hungarian epidemiologist
Terry Oroszi (born 1966), American author and scientist